Birzhan Zhakypov (born July 7, 1984) is an amateur boxer from Kazakhstan, best known for winning the light flyweight gold medal at the 2013 World Amateur Boxing Championship.

He qualified for the 2008 Olympics in Beijing, where he beat Pál Bedák and Hovhannes Danielyan before losing to top favorite Zou Shiming (4:9).

At the 2010 Asian Games he beat Shin Jong-Hun before losing in the final to Zou Shiming.

At the 2011 World Amateur Boxing Championships he lost his first fight to a Cuban.
He later qualified for the 2012 Olympics in London, beating Jérémy Beccu and Mark Anthony Barriga before losing again to eventual gold medalist Zou Shiming.

References
 Qualification
 
 Birzhan Zhakypov's boxing stats International Boxing Association

Living people
1984 births
Olympic boxers of Kazakhstan
Boxers at the 2008 Summer Olympics
Boxers at the 2012 Summer Olympics
Boxers at the 2016 Summer Olympics
Ethnic Kazakh people
Asian Games medalists in boxing
Boxers at the 2010 Asian Games
Boxers at the 2014 Asian Games
World boxing champions
Kazakhstani male boxers
AIBA World Boxing Championships medalists
Asian Games silver medalists for Kazakhstan
Medalists at the 2010 Asian Games
Medalists at the 2014 Asian Games
Light-flyweight boxers
21st-century Kazakhstani people